Ambrosini António Cabaça Salvador (born 3 July 2002), commonly known as Zini, is an Angolan professional footballer who plays as a forward for Greek Super League 2 club AEK Athens B.

Career statistics

Club

International

References

2002 births
Living people
Footballers from Luanda
Angolan footballers
Association football forwards
Angola international footballers
Girabola players
C.D. Primeiro de Agosto players